Gesa Hansen (born 1981 in Arnsberg) is a German-Danish designer.

Education 
Hansen graduated from the Bauhaus University (Germany) and from NZU, Nagoya University of Arts, (Japan).

Career 
Hansen enhanced her training in Paris working for Jean Nouvel Atelier and H5 but also in Japan at the Nippon Design Center.

Following a long family tradition of Danish designers, she founded her design studio in 2009: The Hansen Family.

Hansen's work was exhibited at DesignMai in Berlin (Germany), at 100% Design festival in Seoul (Korea), at Artlab in Brussels (Belgium), at Benetton Group's Fabrica research centre in Treviso and Bologna (Italy), at Salone del Mobile (Italy), at ICFF in New-York and at Meet My Project in Paris and in Milan.

Hansen's work was awarded by two Red Dot Design Awards and the Good Design Award.

Works 
 2011. Remix Dining Table (manufactured by The Hansen Family).
 2011. Remix Drunk (manufactured by The Hansen Family).
 2010. Bee Coffee Table (manufactured by H+H, Hans Hansen Furniture).
 2010. Black Remix - a Surface 2 Air collaboration (manufactured by The Hansen Family).
 2010. Parisien Trunk, designed with Kistuné (manufactured by The Hansen Family).
 2010. Remix Sideboard (manufactured by The Hansen Family). Award: Red Dot Design Award 2010
 2009. Remix Trunk (manufactured by The Hansen Family).
 2009. Remix Desk (manufactured by The Hansen Family). Awards: Red Dot Design Award 2010 and The Good Design Award 2010.
 2009. Remix Coffee Table (manufactured by The Hansen Family).
 2009. Origami Barstool (manufactured by H+H, Hans Hansen Furniture)
 2008. Horizon Wardrobe (manufactured by H+H, Hans Hansen Furniture)

Quotes 
 "Minimalism hates ornements, but ornements love minimalism" - Gesa Hansen, at Imm Cologne, 2009.

References

External links 
 Gesa Hansen website
 The Hansen Family website
 Interview Magazine NZZ - Die fabulöse Welt der Gesa Hansen

Living people
Danish furniture designers
German designers
Danish women designers
1981 births